Gabrielle Gachet, née Magnenat (born 17 February 1980), is a Swiss ski mountaineer.

Gachet was born in Vaulion. In 2011, she married Grégory Gachet. She started ski mountaineering in 1998 and competed first in the Nocturne Morgins race in the same year. She has been member of the national team since 2000.

Selected results 
 2002:
 10th, World Championship team race (together with Andréa Zimmermann)
 2003:
 7th, European Championship single race
 2004:
 8th, World Championship team race (together with Andréa Zimmermann)
 2005:
 1st, World Cup team
 1st, European Championship relay race (together with Cristina Favre-Moretti and Isabella Crettenand-Moretti)
 2nd, European Championship team race (together with Catherine Mabillard)
 2nd, Mountain Attack marathon
 4th, European Championship single race
 2006:
 1st, Tour du Rutor (together with Gloriana Pellissier)
 2nd, World Championship relay race (together with Nathalie Etzensperger, Catherine Mabillard and Séverine Pont-Combe)
 2nd, Mountain Attack marathon
 3rd, Trophée des Gastlosen, together with Jeanine Bapst
 6th, World Championship team race (together with Andréa Zimmermann)
 2007:
 3rd, European Championship relay race (together with Catherine Mabillard and Nathalie Etzensperger)
 6th, European Championship team race (together with Marie Troillet)
 7th, European Championship single race
 8th, European Championship combination ranking
 2008:
 1st, World Championship relay race (together with Marie Troillet, Nathalie Etzensperger, Séverine Pont-Combe)
 2nd, World Championship long distance race
 3rd, World Championship team race (together with Catherine Mabillard)
 8th, World Cup race, Val d'Aran
 2009:
 2nd, European Championship relay race (together with Nathalie Etzensperger and Séverine Pont-Combe)
 2nd, European Championship team race (together with Nathalie Etzensperger)
 5th, European Championship combination ranking
 6th, European Championship single race
 2010:
 2nd, World Championship relay race (together with Marie Troillet and Gabrielle Magnenat)
 2011:
 1st, World Championship relay race (together with Nathalie Etzensperger and Mireille Richard)
 3rd, World Championship sprint
 3rd, World Championship team race (together with Séverine Pont-Combe)
 5th, World Championship single race
 5th, World Championship vertical, total ranking
 2012:
 2nd, Patrouille de la Maya, together with Marie Troillet and Nathalie Etzensperger

Patrouille des Glaciers 

 2004: 2nd, together with Andréa Zimmermann and Jeanine Bapst
 2006: 1st and course record, together with Catherine Mabillard and Séverine Pont-Combe
 2008: 1st and course record, together with Nathalie Etzensperger and Séverine Pont-Combe

Pierra Menta 

 2007: 5th, together with Andréa Zimmermann
 2008: 3rd, together with Séverine Pont-Combe
 2009: 2nd, together with Séverine Pont-Combe
 2010: 4th, together with Marie Troillet
 2011: 3rd, together with Marie Troillet
 2012: 3rd, together with Mireille Richard

Trofeo Mezzalama 

 2011: 4th, together with Émilie Gex-Fabry and Corinne Favre

References

External links 
 Gabrielle Magnenat at skimountaineering.org

1980 births
Living people
Swiss female ski mountaineers
World ski mountaineering champions
People from Jura-North Vaudois District
Sportspeople from the canton of Vaud